Dousman can refer to:

People
 Hercules L. Dousman, 19th century American trader and real estate investor; so of Michael Dousman and father of H. Louis Dousman
 H. Louis Dousman, son of Hercules L. Dousman
 Michael Dousman, father of Hercules L. Dousman and grandfather of H. Louis Dousman

Places
United States
 Dousman, Wisconsin, a village in Waukesha County
 Dousman Hotel, a hotel in Prairie du Chien, Wisconsin named for Hercules L. Dousman